The stack effect or chimney effect is the movement of air into and out of buildings through unsealed openings, chimneys, flue-gas stacks, or other containers, resulting from air buoyancy.  Buoyancy occurs due to a difference in indoor-to-outdoor air density resulting from temperature and moisture differences.  The result is either a positive or negative buoyancy force.  The greater the thermal difference and the height of the structure, the greater the buoyancy force, and thus the stack effect.  The stack effect helps drive natural ventilation, air infiltration, and fires (e.g. the Kaprun tunnel fire, King's Cross underground station fire and the Grenfell Tower fire).

Stack effect in buildings
Since buildings are not totally sealed (at the very minimum, there is always a ground level entrance), the stack effect will cause air infiltration. During the heating season, the warmer indoor air rises up through the building and escapes at the top either through open windows, ventilation openings, or unintentional holes in ceilings, like ceiling fans and recessed lights. The rising warm air reduces the pressure in the base of the building, drawing cold air in through either open doors, windows, or other openings and leakage. During the cooling season, the stack effect is reversed, but is typically weaker due to lower temperature differences.

In a modern high-rise building with a well-sealed envelope, the stack effect can create significant pressure differences that must be given design consideration and may need to be addressed with mechanical ventilation. Stairwells, shafts, elevators, and the like, tend to contribute to the stack effect, while interior partitions, floors, and fire separations can mitigate it. Especially in case of fire, the stack effect needs to be controlled to prevent the spread of smoke and fire, and to maintain tenable conditions for occupants and firefighters. While natural ventilation methods may be effective, such as air outlets being installed closer to the ground, mechanical ventilation is often preferred for taller structures or in buildings with limited space. Smoke extraction is a key consideration in new constructions and must be evaluated in design stages.

The Grenfell Tower fire, as a result of which 72 people died, was in part exacerbated by the stack effect. A cavity between the outer aluminium cladding and the inner insulation formed a chimney and drew the fire upwards.

Normal and reverse stack effect
Two regimes of stack effect can exist in buildings: normal and reverse. Normal stack effect occurs in buildings which are maintained at a higher temperature than the outdoor environment. Warm air within the building has a low density (or high specific volume) and exhibits a greater buoyancy force. Consequently, it rises from lower levels to upper levels through penetrations between floors. This presents a situation where floors underneath the neutral axis of the building have a net negative pressure, whereas floors above the neutral axis have a net positive pressure. The net negative pressure on lower floors can induce outdoor air to infiltrate the building through doors, windows, or ductwork without backdraft dampers. Warm air will attempt to exfiltrate the building envelope through floors above the neutral axis. 

Mechanical refrigeration equipment provides sensible and latent cooling during summer months. This reduces the dry-bulb temperature of the air within the building relative to the outdoor ambient air. It also decreases the specific volume of the air contained within the building, thereby reducing the buoyancy force. Consequently, cool air will travel vertically down the building through elevator shafts, stairwells, and unsealed utility penetrations (i.e., hydronics, electric and water risers). Once the conditioned air reaches the bottom floors underneath the neutral axis, it exfiltrates the building envelopes through unsealed openings such as through dampers, curtainwall, etc. The exfiltrating air on floors underneath the neutral axis will induce outdoor air to infiltrate the building envelope through unsealed openings.

Stack effect in flue gas stacks and chimneys

The stack effect in industrial flue gas stacks is similar to that in buildings, except that it involves hot flue gases having large temperature differences with the ambient outside air. Furthermore, an industrial flue gas stack typically provides little obstruction for the flue gas along its length and is, in fact, normally optimized to enhance the stack effect to reduce fan energy requirements.

Large temperature differences between the outside air and the flue gases can create a strong stack effect in chimneys for buildings using a fireplace for heating.

Before the development of large volume fans, mines were ventilated using the stack effect.  A downcast shaft allowed air into the mine.  At the foot of the upcast shaft a furnace was kept continuously burning.  The shaft (commonly several hundred yards deep) behaved like a chimney and air rose through it drawing fresh air down the downcast stack and around the mine.

Cause for the stack effect

There is a pressure difference between the outside air and the air inside the building caused by the difference in temperature between the outside air and the inside air. That pressure difference ( ΔP ) is the driving force for the stack effect and it can be calculated with the equations presented below. The equations apply only to buildings where air is both inside and outside the buildings. For buildings with one or two floors, h is the height of the building.  For multi-floor, high-rise buildings, h is the distance from the openings at the neutral pressure level (NPL) of the building to either the topmost openings or the lowest openings. Reference explains how the NPL affects the stack effect in high-rise buildings.

For flue gas stacks and chimneys, where air is on the outside and combustion flue gases are on the inside, the equations will only provide an approximation and h is the height of the flue gas stack or chimney.

SI units:

{| border="0" cellpadding="2"
|-
|align=right|where:
| 
|-
!align=right| ΔP
|align=left|= available pressure difference, in Pa
|-
!align=right|C
|align=left|= 0.0342, in K/m
|-
!align=right| a
|align=left|= atmospheric pressure, in Pa
|-
!align=right| h 
|align=left|= height or distance, in m
|-
!align=right| To
|align=left|= absolute outside temperature, in K
|-
!align=right| Ti 
|align=left|= absolute inside temperature, in K
|}

U.S. customary units:

{| border="0" cellpadding="2"
|-
|align=right|where:
| 
|-
!align=right| ΔP
|align=left|= available pressure difference, in psi
|-
!align=right|C
|align=left|= 0.0188, in °R/ft
|-
!align=right| a
|align=left|= atmospheric pressure, in psi
|-
!align=right| h 
|align=left|= height or distance, in ft
|-
!align=right| To
|align=left|= absolute outside temperature, in °R
|-
!align=right| Ti 
|align=left|= absolute inside temperature, in °R
|}

Induced flow

The draft (draught in British English) flow rate induced by the stack effect can be calculated with the equation presented below. The equation applies only to buildings where air is both inside and outside the buildings. For buildings with one or two floors, h is the height of the building and A is the flow area of the openings.  For multi-floor, high-rise buildings, A is the flow area of the openings and h is the distance from the openings at the neutral pressure level (NPL) of the building to either the topmost openings or the lowest openings. Reference explains how the NPL affects the stack effect in high-rise buildings.

For flue gas stacks or chimneys, where air is on the outside and combustion flue gases are on the inside, the equation will only provide an approximation. Also, A is the cross-sectional flow area and h is the height of the flue gas stack or chimney.

SI units:

{| border="0" cellpadding="2"
|-
|align=right|where:
| 
|-
!align=right| Q
|align=left|= stack effect draft (draught in British English) flow rate, m3/s
|-
!align=right| A
|align=left|= flow area, m2
|-
!align=right| C 
|align=left|= discharge coefficient (usually taken to be from 0.65 to 0.70)
|-
!align=right| g
|align=left|= gravitational acceleration, 9.81 m/s2 
|-
!align=right| h 
|align=left|= height or distance, m 
|-
!align=right| Ti 
|align=left|= average inside temperature, K
|-
!align=right| To 
|align=left|= outside air temperature, K 
|}

U.S. customary units:

{| border="0" cellpadding="2"
|-
|align=right|where:
| 
|-
!align=right| Q
|align=left|= stack effect draft flow rate, ft3/s
|-
!align=right| A
|align=left|= area, ft2
|-
!align=right| C 
|align=left|= discharge coefficient (usually taken to be from 0.65 to 0.70)
|-
!align=right| g
|align=left|= gravitational acceleration, 32.17 ft/s2 
|-
!align=right| h 
|align=left|= height or distance, ft 
|-
!align=right| Ti 
|align=left|= average inside temperature, °R
|-
!align=right| To 
|align=left|= outside air temperature, °R
|}

This equation assumes that the resistance to the draft flow is similar to the resistance of flow through an orifice characterized by a discharge coefficient C.

See also
HVAC (heating, ventilation and air conditioning)
Ventilation shaft
Solar chimney
Solar updraft tower
Draft (boiler)
Inco Superstack
Ekibastuz GRES-2 Power Station
Windcatcher
Cross ventilation

References

External links
 Stack Effect: When Buildings Act Like Chimneys --Green Building Advisor
 National Research Council Canada - CBD-104 Stack Effects in Buildings
 

Building engineering
Chemical engineering
Heating, ventilation, and air conditioning
Thermodynamics
Buoyancy